Yakuhananomia bidentata is a species of beetle in the family Mordellidae. It was described in 1824 by Thomas Say. It is found in eastern North America.

References

Mordellidae
Beetles of North America
Beetles described in 1824
Taxa named by Thomas Say